The Yamaha Reface CS is a virtual analog synthesizer released in September 2015. It is primarily inspired by the iconic Yamaha CS-80 polyphonic analog synthesizer. It features five distinct oscillator models.

See also
List of Yamaha products

References

Yamaha synthesizers
Virtual analog synthesizers